Inter Lions Football Club Inc  is a semi-professional and amateur football (soccer) club based in Concord, New South Wales, Australia (Canada Bay Area of Sydney). Established in 1983 as Majors Bay Soccer Club, the club changed to its current name in 1995.  The club's home kit borrows the colours of Inter Milan; blue and black vertical stripes. As of the 2022 season, the club is currently competing in the NSW League Two, NSW Women's Premier League 2, NPL 2 Boys' youth League and the Canterbury District Soccer Football Association.

The club also competes in community football within the Canterbury District Association from U6s through to all age men's and women's, including small-sided football for juniors 5 to 11-year-olds, both boys and girls. Junior and senior competition sides range from 12 years of age through to adult age teams, males and females. The club provides teams for veteran age groups, namely U35's and over 45's, again for both men and women.

Honours

Regional
 NSW Division State League 1/NPL 3/NSW League Two
Premiers (1): 2022

 NSW Division State League 2/NPL 4/NSW League Three
Premiers  (1): 2004

 NSW Division State League 3
Premiers  (1): 2003
Champions (1): 2003

External links 
 Inter Lions web site

Soccer clubs in Sydney
Association football clubs established in 1983
1983 establishments in Australia